The Porsche 718 is a series of one- or two-seat sports-racing cars built by Porsche from 1957 to 1962. An open-wheel single-seat model was developed for Formula racing.

Details
The 718 was a development of the successful Porsche 550A with improvements made to the body work and suspension. The car's full name is 718 RSK, where "RS" stands for RennSport (sports-racing) and the "K" reflects the shape of the car's revised torsion-bar suspension. It had a mid-engined layout and used the  1.5-litre Type 547/3 quad-cam engine introduced in the 550A.

Variations

718 RSK Mittellenker
In 1957 the Fédération Internationale de l'Automobile (FIA) changed their rules to allow cars with enveloping bodywork to compete in Formula races. That year Porsche entered three 550/1500RS Spyders in the German Grand Prix Formula Two (F2) event. Changes to the cars were minimal, being limited to removing the passenger seats and spare tires.

For 1958 Porsche fielded a modified 718, called the RSK Mittellenker (centre-steer), for F2 events. The bodywork for this car was only slightly different from the sportscar model, but the single seat was now in the centre of the cockpit, with the steering wheel, pedals, and shift lever relocated to accommodate the change and a fairing enclosing more of the cockpit opening. Jean Behra drove the car to a win at the F2 event at Reims that year. At the German Grand Prix at the Nürburgring, driver Edgar Barth placed sixth overall and second in his class. At the Berlin Grand Prix at AVUS the car won both its heat and the F2 class in the hands of driver Masten Gregory.

718/2

In 1959 Porsche unveiled the prototype of a narrow, open-wheeled car called the Porsche 718/2 that married the 718's mechanicals with a more traditional single-seat Formula body. The unpainted car was entered in the 1959 Monaco Grand Prix, where driver Wolfgang von Trips qualified twelfth, but crashed on the second lap of the race. At Reims driver Joakim Bonnier finished third. A total of five cars were built. Some of these four-cylinder cars were later raced in F1 under the 1962 1 litre formula.

In October 1958 the FIA had announced another change to the regulations for Formula One (F1). Beginning in the 1961 season, engine capacity would be limited to the same 1.5 litres as in Formula Two. This meant that Porsche could use their 718/2s almost unchanged in F1.

RS 60
For the 1960 season the FIA made changes to the regulation regarding the windscreen and cockpit size. These rules changes together with a larger (1.6-litre) Type 547/3 engine, developing  and a new double wishbone rear suspension brought about the RS 60 model. The RS 60 brought Porsche victory at the 1960 12 Hours of Sebring with a car driven by Hans Herrmann and Olivier Gendebien. 1960 also saw Porsche win the Targa Florio with Hans Herrmann being joined on the winner podium by Jo Bonnier and Graham Hill. The RS 60 also ensured that Porsche successfully defended their European Hill Climb Championship for the third year in a row.

RS 61
For 1961 the model name was changed to "RS 61" although it was almost identical to the RS 60. An RS 61 won the European Hill Climb Championship.

W-RS
The W-RS version was developed in 1961. Initially fitted with a 4-cylinder engine, the car was later fitted with Porsche's air-cooled Type 771 2.0 L flat-eight engine which produced . A W-RS finished 8th at Le Mans in 1963. The W-RS continued Porsche's success in the European Hill Climb Championship with Edgar Barth claiming the title in 1963. Porsche would go on to win a European Hill Climb Championship every year until 1982, a total of 42 titles.

The W-RS continued racing until 1964 when it was replaced by the 904.

718 GTR Coupé

A Coupé version was developed from the RS 61. Initially fitted with a 4-cylinder engine, this car was also upgraded to an 8-cylinder F1 derived engine which produced . The car was also fitted with disc brakes. A GTR Coupé enabled drivers Jo Bonnier and Carlo Maria Abate to win the Targa Florio in 1963 once more.

Racing history

Endurance / sportscar racing
The 718 made its racing debut at the 1957 24 Hours of Le Mans driven by Umberto Maglioli and Edgar Barth. The car failed to finish the race due to an accident.

In 1958, the car finished first in class and third overall at Le Mans guided by Jean Behra and Hans Herrmann. Jean Behra also drove one of the cars home finishing second at the Targa Florio (an FIA World Sportscar Championship race from 1955–1973). 

In 1959, the car, driven by Edgar Barth and Wolfgang Seidel, achieved overall victory at the Targa Florio for its first time. A 718 also won the European Hill Climb Championship in both 1958 and 1959. A 718 RS60 won the Targa Florio again in 1960.

In 1961 Masten Gregory and Bob Holbert piloted a 718/4 RS Spyder to a class win at Le Mans. In 1963, Porsche got another Targa Florio victory, with a 718 GTR Coupé, making it three wins at that event for a 718 car.

Formula Two
Porsche made their F2 debut with victories at Reims and AVUS in 1958. In 1959 other RSK's were converted for single seater racing and at the XV B.A.R.C. '200' at Aintree in 1960 Porsche scored a 1–2–3 victory with Stirling Moss, Jo Bonnier and Graham Hill all in 718s. The feat was repeated again later in the year at the race at Zeltweg, Austria.

Formula One
Formula One switched to a 1.5-litre formula in 1961 and Porsche entered three 718s for Dan Gurney, Hans Herrmann and Jo Bonnier. Gurney scored three 2nd places (France, Italy and United States) taking him to 4th place in the Drivers' Championship. For 1962, Porsche entered a new car, the Porsche 804 in Formula One.

Carel Godin de Beaufort, a privateer, entered a 718 in F1 between 1961 and 1964. He was killed driving his 718 during practice for the 1964 German Grand Prix at the Nürburgring.

Gallery

See also
Porsche 787 – Formula 1 car
Porsche 804 – Formula 1 car
Porsche in motorsport

References

Notes

Bibliography

External links 

 Expert Car Review website

718
Sports cars
718
Cars powered by boxer engines
24 Hours of Le Mans race cars
Rear mid-engine, rear-wheel-drive vehicles